K.S. Veerabhadrappa (born 29 July 1929) is an Indian politician and Member of Parliament (MP) in 6th Lok Sabha, represented the Bellary in Lok Sabha, lower house of the Indian Parliament. He is also Director of M/S Karnataka Patrika Private Ltd., which published 'Samyukta, Karnataka' (Kannada Daily), 'Karma-veera' (Weekly), 'Kasturi' (Monthly) and 'Chitradeep' (Monthly).

Life 
Veerabhadrappa was born on 29 July 1929 in Gadag, Dharwar District. K. S. Sangappa was his father.

He married Smt. K. S. Rathnamma and the couple has 6 sons and  2 daughters.

References 

1929 births
Lok Sabha members from Karnataka
India MPs 1977–1979
People from Bellary district
Living people